Erkki is a Finnish and Estonian given name (derived from Erik). Notable people with the name include:

 Erkki Aadli (born 1974), Estonian orienteer
 Erkki Aaltonen (1910–1990), Finnish composer
 Erkki Ala-Könni (1911– 1996), Finnish ethnomusicologist
 Erkki Bahovski (born 1970), Estonian journalist
 Erkki Ertama (1927-2010),  Finnish composer and conductor
 Erkki Hartikainen (born 1942), Finnish atheist activist and educator 
 Erkki Haukipuro (1921- 2001), Finnish politician
 Erkki Hautamäki (born 1930), Finnish military major and historian
 Erkki Huttunen (1901–1956), Finnish architect
 Erkki Junkkarinen (1929-2008), Finnish singer
 Erkki Kaila (1867–1944), Finnish Lutheran Archbishop of Turku and politician 
 Erkki Karu (1887–1935), Finnish film director, screenwriter and producer
 Erkki Kataja (1924–1969), Finnish track and field athlete and Olympic medalist
 Erkki Keldo (born 1990), Estonian politician
 Erkki Kerttula (1909–1989), Finnish fencer and Olympic competitor
 Erkki Kilpinen (born 1948), Finnish nordic combined skier and Olympic competitor
 Erkki Kohvakka (born 1937), Finnish orienteering competitor
 Erkki Kokkonen (1938–2008), Finnish film director 
 Erkki Koiso (1934-2000), Finnish ice hockey player 
 Erkki Korhonen (born 1956), Finnish pianist, conductor and former director of the Finnish National Opera
 Erkki Koskinen (born 1925), Finnish cyclist and Olympic competitor 
 Erkki Kourula (born 1948), Finnish judge of the International Criminal Court
 Erkki Kurenniemi (born 1941), one of the most important characters in the history of Finnish electronic music
 Erkki Laine (1957-2009), Finnish ice hockey player and Olympic medalist
 Erkki Lehtonen (born 1957), Finnish ice hockey player and Olympic medalist
 Erkki Leikola (1900-1986), Finnish politician
 Erkki Liikanen (born 1950), Chairman of the Board of the Bank of Finland
 Erkki Lill (born 1968), Estonian curler and curling coach
 Erkki Mallenius (1928-2003), Finnish boxer and Olympic medalist 
 Erkki Melartin (1875–1937), Finnish composer
 Erkki Miinala (born 1986), Finnish goalball player and Olympic medalist
 Erkki Nghimtina (born 1948), Namibian politician  
 Erkki Niemi (born 1962), Finnish high jumper and Olympic competitor
 Erkki Nordberg (1946–2012), Finnish military colonel and historian
 Erkki Oja (born 1948), Finnish computer scientist 
 Erkki Pakkanen (1930-1973), Finnish boxer and Olympic medalist
 Erkki Peltonen (1861-1942), Finnish politician 
 Erkki Penttilä (1932–2005), Finnish wrestler and Olympic medalist
 Erkki Pohjanheimo (born 1942), Finnish television producer and director
 Erkki Pukka (born 1940), Finnish ski-jumper
 Erkki Pulliainen (born 1938), Finnish politician
 Erkki Pystynen (born 1929), Finnish politician
 Erkki Raappana (1893–1962), commander of the 14th Division of the Finnish Army
 Erkki Räikkönen (1900– 1961), Finnish nationalist leader
 Erkki Rajamäki (born 1978), Finnish ice-hockey player
 Erkki Rapo (1946–2004), Finnish amateur autograph collector
 Erkki Ruoslahti (born c. 1940), Finnish physician and cancer researcher 
 Erkki Ruuhinen (born 1943), Finnish graphic designer and artist
 Erkki Salmenhaara (1941–2002), Finnish composer and musicologist
 Erkki Savolainen (1917–1993), Finnish boxer and Olympic competitor
 Erkki Toivanen (1938–2011), Finnish journalist and news presenter 
 Erkki Tuominen (1914–1975), Finnish politician
 Erkki Tuomioja (born 1946), Finnish politician
 Erkki-Sven Tüür (born 1959), Estonian composer
 Erkki Virtanen (born 1952), Finnish politician 

Finnish masculine given names
Estonian masculine given names